Baron Alphonse Chodron de Courcel (30 July 1835 – 17 June 1919) was a French diplomat and politician. He was French ambassador to Germany from 1881 to 1886, French ambassador to the United Kingdom from 1894 to 1898, and Senator of Seine-et-Oise from 1892 to 1919.

He represented France at the Berlin Conference of 1884–1885.

He presided over the I Olympic Congress in Paris in 1894, where it was decided to re-establish the Olympic Games.

His grandson, Baron Geoffroy Chodron de Courcel, was French ambassador to the United Kingdom from 1962 to 1972.

References 

 "Alphonse Chodron de Courcel", in Dictionnaire des parlementaires français (1889-1940), sous la direction de Jean Jolly, PUF, 1960

1835 births
1919 deaths
French diplomats
French Senators of the Third Republic
Barons of France